Alakol District is a district of Jetisu Region in Kazakhstan. The administrative center of the district is the town of Usharal. Population:   

The Tunkuruz Hydroelectric Power Plant is located in the district.

Geography
The district is located in the Balkhash-Alakol Depression. Parts of its eastern border (where the district borders on East Kazakhstan Region) run through the chain of lakes - Lakes Sasykkol, Koshkarkol, Alakol, and Zhalanashkol. There are no major rivers in the district; the fairly small Tentek River, which flows toward Lake Sasykkol, but reaches it only intermittently, is the largest one.

References

Districts of Kazakhstan
Almaty Region